Isko or ISKO may refer to:

People
 Isko Moreno (born 1974), Filipino politician and actor
 Isko Salvador (born 1958), Filipino actor, comedian and comedy scriptwriter

Organizations
 International Society for Knowledge Organization
 ISKO (clothing company)

Other
 1409 Isko, provisional designation of an asteroid

See also
 Isco (born 1992), Spanish professional footballer